Istgah Kheyam (also Romanized as Īstgāh Kheyām) is a village in Ordughesh Rural District, Zeberkhan District, Nishapur County, Razavi Khorasan Province, Iran. At the 2006 census, its population was 18, in 4 families.

References 

Populated places in Nishapur County